Battrum is an unincorporated community in Riverside Rural Municipality No. 168, Saskatchewan, Canada.

See also 
 List of communities in Saskatchewan

Riverside No. 168, Saskatchewan
Unincorporated communities in Saskatchewan